The Kurdistan Regional Government (KRG) (Hikûmetî Herêmî Kurdistan) is the official executive body of the autonomous Kurdistan Region of northern Iraq.

The cabinet is selected by the majority party or list who also select the prime minister of the Iraqi Kurdish polity. The president is directly elected by the electorate of the region and is the head of the cabinet and chief of state who delegates executive powers to the cabinet. The prime minister is traditionally the head of the legislative body but also shares executive powers with the president. The President of Kurdistan Region is also the commander-in-chief of the Peshmerga Armed Forces.

2014 
From mid-2013 to mid-2014, the KRG "built up their own defenses by creating a security belt stretching more than 1,000 km (600 miles) from the Iranian border all the way to Syria – skirting around Mosul, a city of 2 million people they appear[ed] to have no intention of fighting for." In August 2014, ISIL attacked the Kurds.

On 1 July 2014, Masoud Barzani announced that "Iraq's Kurds will hold an independence referendum within months."

2017 
In September, the 2017 Kurdistan Region independence referendum was held regarding Kurdish independence from Iraq. 92% of Iraqi Kurds participating in the referendum voted in favor of independence. The referendum was regarded as illegal by the federal government in Baghdad, and on 6 November, Iraq's Supreme Federal Court ruled that no Iraqi province was allowed to secede in order to preserve the unity of Iraq.

On 14 November, the KRG announced it would respect the Supreme Federal Court's ruling, stating that "this decision must become a basis for starting an inclusive national dialogue between (Kurdish authorities in) Erbil and Baghdad to resolve all disputes".

See also 
Kurdish Supreme Committee

References

 
2005 in Iraq
2005 in politics
2005 establishments in Iraqi Kurdistan
Government agencies established in 2005
History of Upper Mesopotamia
Kurdish separatism in Iraq
Indigenous affairs ministries